Wheeling is an unincorporated community in Washington Township, Delaware County, Indiana.

History
The post office Wheeling once contained was originally called Cranberry. The Cranberry post office was started in 1834, renamed Wheeling in 1838, and remained in operation until it was discontinued in 1933.

Geography

References

External links

Unincorporated communities in Delaware County, Indiana
Unincorporated communities in Indiana